The Western Journal of Medicine was a peer-reviewed medical journal. It was established in 1856 as the Transactions of the Medical Society of the State of California. It was renamed California State Journal of Medicine in 1902 and volume numbering was restarted at 1. In 1924 it was renamed California and Western Medicine and in 1946 California Medicine. In 1974, it obtained its final title, Western Journal of Medicine, which was styled as wjm from 1999 on. In 1985, the journal absorbed Arizona Medicine. It ceased publication in 2002 because it was not financially viable any more. The journal was lastly published by the BMJ Group with Michael Wilkes as its editor-in-chief.

Abstracting and indexing 
The journal was abstracted and indexed by EBSCO databases, Gale databases, MEDLINE, ProQuest, PubMed, and Scopus.

References

External links 
 Free full-text journal archive at PubMed Central

BMJ Group academic journals
English-language journals
General medical journals
Open access journals
Publications established in 1856
Publications disestablished in 2002
Monthly journals
Defunct journals of the United States